Jasionna may refer to the following places:
Jasionna, Łęczyca County in Łódź Voivodeship (central Poland)
Jasionna, Sieradz County in Łódź Voivodeship (central Poland)
Jasionna, Skierniewice County in Łódź Voivodeship (central Poland)
Jasionna, Zgierz County in Łódź Voivodeship (central Poland)
Jasionna, Świętokrzyskie Voivodeship (south-central Poland)
Jasionna, Masovian Voivodeship (east-central Poland)
Jasionna, Greater Poland Voivodeship (west-central Poland)
Jasionna, Lubusz Voivodeship (west Poland)